Claude Brixhe (24 April 1933 – 2 March 2021) was a French linguist and Professor Emeritus at the University of Nancy in France. His research interests included ancient and modern Greek dialects, Koine Greek, the history of the Greek alphabet, and non-Greek Anatolian languages.

Koine Greek
Claude Brixhe was born on 24 April 1933 in Serrouville.

In a 1993 article, Brixhe wrote about the influence of koine on the Doric dialect Cretan. He studied Cretan inscriptions from the Hellenistic period and substantiated the presence of forms that were a product of linguistic admixture, as well as those that could be attributed to koine. Araceli Striano writes: "This fact highlighted something which scholars had already suspected: koine did not suddenly replace the local dialects nor did those dialects disappear abruptly. On the contrary, the process of linguistic leveling in the Greek-speaking world was rather gradual, fostering the emergence of standard local varieties with their own distinctive particularities due to the coexistence of koine and different variants of ancient Greek."

References  

21st-century French people
Scholars of Ancient Greek
Academic staff of Nancy-Université